Balación, also known as Parao or Balasian, was a large native sailing outrigger ship of the Tagalog people of Laguna in the Philippines.

See also
Armadahan
Casco (barge)
Guilalo
Salambaw

References

Indigenous ships of the Philippines